Venereology is an album by the Japanese noise musician Merzbow. It was inspired by death metal and grindcore.

It was the first of five Merzbow albums released by the American heavy metal label Relapse Records, under their Release Entertainment imprint, and as such was responsible for bringing Merzbow's work to a much wider audience in the United States. Venereology has also gained notoriety for the loudness of its mastering, which violated American limitations on the dynamic range allowed on CDs, and for its third track, "I Lead You Towards Glorious Times", which is often cited to be the loudest track created in CD format - having a RMS value of 0.00dB. The liner notes includes an extensive thank you list in the style of many metal releases.

Venereology was reissued on vinyl with a revised track list and bonus tracks by Relapse in March 2019.

Background

Akita then explained that his next album for Relapse, Pulse Demon, was back to his normal sound and was recorded sober.

Track listing
CD

LP

Personnel
Credits adapted from the album notes.
Musicians
Masami Akita – performer, "decomposition," mixing
Kazuyoshi Kimoto – bass guitar on end part of "Klo Ken Phantasie" and on "Outtrack 2"
Reiko Azuma – noise on "I Lead You Towards Glorious Times"
Bara – vocals on "I Lead You Towards Glorious Times" and "Slave New Desart"
Technical and visual personnel
Mackerel Can Molding Company – live recording on "I Lead You Towards Glorious Times"
Antoine Bernhart – atrocity photos research
Naomi Hosokawa – photos transformation assistance
Abtechtonics – art direction, color
David Shirk – mastering [CD]
James Plotkin – mastering [LP reissue]
Jonathan Canady – additional design [LP reissue]
Jacob Speis – layout [LP reissue]
Matt Jacobson – executive producer, visual & logo interpretation for production
Bill Yurkiewicz – executive producer
Masami Akita – remixing and rearrangement from original DAT tapes at Munemihouse, Tokyo in October 2018 [LP reissue]

Release history

References

External links

1994 albums
Merzbow albums